Ron Garney is an American comic book writer/artist, known for his work on books such as JLA, The Amazing Spider-Man, Silver Surfer, Hulk, Daredevil and Captain America.

Career
Garney has worked on JLA, The Amazing Spider-Man, Daredevil, Ghost Rider volume 3, Wolverine, Captain America, X-Men, Silver Surfer and Hulk.  He has also written for Hulk in collaboration with Jerry Ordway.

Garney's late 2000s projects include Skaar: Son of Hulk and Wolverine: Weapon X.
Garney worked as the Costume illustrator on the 2007 Will Smith film I Am Legend, and the 2010 Nicolas Cage fantasy film, The Sorcerer's Apprentice.

Bibliography

As artist

Interior pencil work
G.I. Joe: A Real American Hero #110, 117 (Marvel Comics, 1991)
Marc Spector: Moon Knight #26-33, 35-38 (Marvel Comics, 1991–92)
Daredevil #296, 304, Annual #7 (Marvel Comics, 1991–92)
Nightstalkers #1-8 (Marvel Comics, 1992–93)
Morbius, the Living Vampire #4 (Marvel Comics, 1992)
Ghost Rider vol. 3 #39-50, 52 (Marvel Comics, 1993–94)
Wolverine vol. 2 #86 (Marvel Comics, 1994)
Ghost Rider, Wolverine, Punisher: The Dark Design (Marvel Comics, 1994)
Uncanny X-Men #321 (Marvel Comics, 1995)
X-Men vol. 2 #41 (Marvel Comics, 1995)
Spider-Man Unlimited #9, 14 (Marvel Comics, 1995–06)
Captain America #444-454 (Marvel Comics, 1995–96)
Captain America: The Legend (Marvel Comics, 1996)
The Amazing Spider-Man #416-417 (Marvel Comics, 1996)
Silver Surfer, vol. 3 #123, 125–129, -1, 131, (Marvel Comics, 1996–97)
Captain America, vol. 3 #1-5, 12 (Marvel Comics, 1998)
Captain America: Sentinel of Liberty #1-6 (Marvel Comics, 1998)
Hulk #1-4, 6–9, 11–20, (Marvel Comics, 1999–2000)
JLA: Our Worlds at War #1 (DC Comics, 2001)
Uncanny X-Men #401-402, 410–412, 421–424, 435-436 (Marvel Comics, 2002–04)
JLA #101-114 (DC Comics, 2004–05)
Green Arrow vol. 3 #55-57 (DC Comics, 2005–06)
The Amazing Spider-Man #529, 532-543 (Marvel Comics, 2006–07)
Wolverine vol. 3 #62-65 (Marvel Comics, 2008)
Skaar: Son of Hulk #1-6 (Marvel Comics, 2008)
Wolverine: Weapon X #1-5, 11-15 (Marvel Comics, 2009–10)
Ultimate Captain America #1-4 (Marvel Comics, 2011)
Daken: The Dark Wolverine #9.1 (Marvel Comics, 2011)
Wolverine vol. 4 #17-19, 300, 304 (Marvel Comics, 2011–12)
Fantastic Four #605-606 (Marvel Comics, 2012)
Ultimate Comics: The Ultimates #12 (Marvel Comics, 2012)
Uncanny X-Men vol. 2 #18 (Marvel Comics, 2012)
A+X #1 (Marvel Comics, 2012)
Uncanny X-Force vol. 2 #1-4 (Marvel Comics, 2013)
Thor: God of Thunder #13-17 (Marvel Comics, 2013–14)
Men of Wrath #1-5 (Icon, 2014–15)
Age of Ultron vs. Marvel Zombies #1 (Marvel Comics, 2015)
Daredevil vol. 5 #1-5, 10–14, 17–18, 20, 26–28, 598-600 (Marvel Comics, 2015–18)
Astonishing X-Men vol. 4 #11 (Marvel Comics, 2018)
Savage Sword of Conan vol. 2 #1-5 (Marvel Comics, 2019)
War of the Realms Omega (Marvel Comics, 2019)
Marvel Comics #1000 (Marvel Comics, 2019)
Savage Avengers Annual 1 (Marvel Comics, 2019)
Fantastic Four: Grimm Noir One-Shot (Marvel Comics, 2020)
Juggernaut vol. 3 #1-5 (Marvel Comics, 2021)
BRZRKR #1–ongoing (Boom Studios, 2021-ongoing)

As inker
Fantastic Four #605
Wolverine: Weapon X vol. 1 #4, #5
Daken: Dark Wolverine vol. 1 #9.1
Wolverine vol. 2 #300, vol. 3 #62

Covers
New Avengers vol. 2 #29
Fantastic four vol. 1 #19, #605, #606
Incredible Hulk vol. 2 #13, #16, vol. 3 #13 
The Amazing Spider-Man vol. 1 #416, 417, 530–540, 
What if?: Spider-Man Back in Black
Uncanny X-Force #18, #19
Uncanny X-Men vol. 1 #401, 402, 410, 411, 443
Wolverine/X-Force vol. 1 #1, 12
Captain America vol. 3 #1, 454, 446, 447, 448, 452, 453
Wolverine vol. 3 #65 vol. 4 #19, 62
Silver Surfer #123
Ghost Rider vol. 3 #49

As writer
Captain America: Sentinel of Liberty #1-4
Hulk vol. 1 #9, #10

References

External links

American comics artists
Year of birth missing (living people)
Living people